Noosa may refer to:

Places 

 The Shire of Noosa in Queensland, Australia
 Noosa River
 Noosa Heads
 Noosaville
 Noosa National Park
 Noosa Biosphere Reserve
 Electoral district of Noosa

Music 

 Noosa (artist)

Festivals 

 Noosa Festival of Surfing